Mark O'Brien may refer to:

 Mark O'Brien (actor) (born 1984), Canadian actor
 Mark O'Brien (cyclist) (born 1987), Australian cyclist
 Mark O'Brien (footballer, born 1984), Irish footballer, plays for Shelbourne F.C.
 Mark O'Brien (footballer, born 1992), Irish footballer
 Mark O'Brien (poet) (1949–1999), American poet and advocate for the disabled
 Mark O'Brien (hurler), Irish hurler